Erie High School is a high school in Erie, Pennsylvania, in the United States. Formerly called Central Tech High School, it was renamed in 2017 after the Erie City School District converted two of the other high schools, Strong Vincent High School and East High School, into middle schools.

The first Erie High School opened in 1866, before being renamed Central High School in 1920.

Erie High School celebrated its first graduating class in 2018, about 400 out of a total of 2,278 students.

Shooting 
On April 5, 2022, shortly after 9:20 am, a shooting occurred in the school. One student was shot by another student but was in stable condition. The school was locked down and students were dismissed classroom by classroom when there was found to be no additional threats. The Erie City School District announced later that the school would be closed until after Spring Break on April 18, 2022, while the district works on a plan to allow students to safely return. The suspect has since been apprehended.

References

External links
 Erie High School
 Erie City School District

Public high schools in Pennsylvania
Education in Erie, Pennsylvania
Schools in Erie County, Pennsylvania